The Idaho Centennial Ladies' Open was a women's professional golf tournament on the LPGA Tour, played only in 1963 in Boise, Idaho. The 54-hole event was held  at Hillcrest Country Club over the Labor Day weekend, Saturday through Monday.

Mickey Wright won the event by four strokes over runner-up Kathy Whitworth; both players shot 68 (−3) in the final round. Tied for third at 215 (+2) were Shirley Englehorn of Caldwell and Marlene Hagge. It was Wright's 10th of 13 victories on the LPGA Tour in 1963, and her 49th of 82 career wins.

The centennial referred to the establishment of the Idaho Territory in 1863; statehood for Idaho came 27 years later in 1890.

Winner

References

Former LPGA Tour events
Golf in Idaho
History of women in Idaho
1963 establishments in Idaho
1963 disestablishments in Idaho